Hofling could refer to:

 Ana Paula Höfling, American dance researcher
 Eckart Höfling, German Catholic priest
 Tom Hoefling, American activist and politician
 Hofling hospital experiment